Christian Heinle (born 30 March 1985) is an Austrian football manager and former player who is currently the manager of Ried.

Career 
Heinle played for SV Grieskirchen, SV Bad Schallerbach and Union Rottenbach in lower classes in Upper Austria. After the 2020–21 season he ended his career.

2014–15 he started as assistant coach to his father at Union Rottenbach, where he was also acting as a player. 2015–16 he became playing coach of Rottenbach. In 2017–18 he became player coach of SV Grieskirchen.

2020–21 he went to SV Ried and became head coach of the second team. January 2021 he became assistant coach to Miron Muslic in the first team, but stayed head coach of the second team. Also under the head-coach Andreas Heraf he stayed as assistant. In November 2021 he became caretaker of the first team. In the winter of 2021 Robert Ibertsberger became new coach of Ried, and Heinle again worked as assistant.

In April 2022 Heinle replaced Robert Ibertsberger as head coach in the Austrian Football Bundesliga.

References
all references in German

External links
OEFB Profile

1985 births
Living people
People from Grieskirchen District
Austrian footballers
Austrian football managers
SV Ried managers
Association football forwards